Tapan Chowdhury is a Bangladeshi businessman. On January 14, 2007, he was appointed as one of the advisers for the Caretaker government of Bangladesh under Chief Adviser Fakhruddin Ahmed. He resigned from caretaker government on January 8, 2008 along with other four advisers.

Early life
Tapan Chowdhury born in Aataikula, Pabna, the second son of Samson H. Chowdhury,

Business career
He is the Managing Director of Square Pharmaceuticals Limited, Square Textiles Limited and Square Hospital Both companies are among the largest enterprises in their respective sectors.

Chowdhury was a President of Metropolitan Chamber of Commerce and Industry (MCCI). He was also associated with the Young Man Christian Association (YMCA) as its president, and was the Vice-President of Bangladesh Baptist fellowship.

He also was a member of the executive committee of the Bangladesh Employers Association, and Bangladesh Textile Mills Association.

Chowdhury's other positions includes the Directorship of Square Toiletries Ltd, Pioneer Insurance Ltd, Continental Hospital Ltd, and several other companies.

References

Living people
Advisors of Caretaker Government of Bangladesh
Year of birth missing (living people)
Notre Dame College, Dhaka alumni